"Good as Gone" is a song co-written recorded by American country music group Little Big Town.  It was released in September 2006 as the third single from their album The Road to Here.  The song was written by group members Karen Fairchild, Kimberly Roads, Phillip Sweet and Jimi Westbrook with Wayne Kirkpatrick.

Critical reception
The song received a favorable review from Deborah Evans Price of Billboard, who wrote that "this energetic, uptempo number showcases the group's stellar harmonies as well as its songwriting prowess."

Music video
The music video was directed by Chris Hicky and premiered in September 2006.

Chart performance
The song debuted at number 58 on the U.S. Billboard Hot Country Songs chart for the week of September 30, 2006.

References

2006 singles
Little Big Town songs
Equity Music Group singles
Songs written by Karen Fairchild
Songs written by Kimberly Schlapman
Songs written by Phillip Sweet
Songs written by Jimi Westbrook
Songs written by Wayne Kirkpatrick
Music videos directed by Chris Hicky
2005 songs